The Marcali Synagogue was a now demolished Jewish religious building in Marcali, Hungary.

History 
Although a synagogue was built in Marcali as early as 1840, the real attraction of the town was the new synagogue, inaugurated in 1906, designed by Marcell Komor and Dezső Jakab. The two designers reconciled the Hungarian motifs with the Art Nouveau world. The synagogue square was centrally arranged, the exterior of which was characterized by the dome and the two towers. The building was formally related to the synagogue in Subotica. The greatly reduced number of Jewish communities after World War II was no longer able to use the building much. It was demolished in 1963.

Sources 
 (ed.) László Gerő: Magyarországi zsinagógák, Műszaki Könyvkiadó, Budapest, 1989, 166–167.p

Synagogues in Hungary
1906 establishments in Hungary
Buildings and structures in Somogy County
Demolished buildings and structures in Hungary
Buildings and structures demolished in 1963
Destroyed synagogues